Michael Horner (born January 8, 1968, in Jacksonville, Florida) is an American Republican politician and a former member of the House of Representatives of the U.S. state of Florida.

Horner graduated with a bachelor's degree from the University of Florida in 1989.  He then went on to graduate school at the University of Central Florida, and graduated with a Master's in Public Administration in 1995. He currently lives in Kissimmee, Florida with his family.

Resignation
On September 24, 2012, Horner was running for re-election when he suddenly resigned from the Florida House of Representatives after his name surfaced on a list of brothel clients in evidence against an accused prostitution ring leader. In his resignation statement, Horner said "I deeply regret decisions I made that are causing my family unjustifiable pain and embarrassment."

References

External links
Official Profile

University of Florida alumni
University of Central Florida alumni
Republican Party members of the Florida House of Representatives
1968 births
Living people
Politicians from Jacksonville, Florida